Central Heights High School is a public high school located in Nacogdoches, Texas, United States, and classified as a 3A school by the UIL.  It is part of the Central Heights Independent School District located in north central Nacogdoches County.  In 2017, the school was rated "Met Standard" by the Texas Education Agency.

Athletics
Central Heights compete in these sports - 

Baseball
Boys & girls basketball
Boys & girls cross country
Boys & girls golf
Softball
Boys & girls swimming & diving
Boys & girls tennis
Boys & girls track & field
Volleyball
Boys & girls soccer

State titles
Baseball - 
2004 (2A)
2017 (3A)
Girls basketball - 
2001 (2A)
Girls cross country - 
1997 (2A)

References

External links
Central Heights HS

Schools in Nacogdoches County, Texas
Public high schools in Texas